Branksome Park is a suburb of Poole in Dorset, which adjoins Branksome, Dorset.

Description
Branksome Park is one of Poole's most affluent areas alongside Sandbanks, Canford Cliffs, Evening Hill, Lilliput, and Salterns Marina. It is on the border of Poole, with Bournemouth being on the other side of The Avenue. It is less than two miles (3 km) from the shopping areas of Westbourne and The Square in the centre of Bournemouth.

House prices vary widely in the area; there are small 1960s flats costing just under £200,000 and mansions costing well over £3 million. The area is a contrast to neighbouring Sandbanks, whilst although being affluent, the community is not focused towards development based around the beach; there are very few properties directly on the waterfront. Instead most of the residential zone of Branksome Park is inland.

Demographically a large percentage of the elderly people live in the area (Poole Town and Parkstone also have a high percentage). The population of elderly people (mainly over 85) in the area is expected to rise even more by 2025.  Although Branksome Park is geographically part of Poole, its origin, like those of Canford Cliffs, Sandbanks, and Lilliput, is a direct result of overspill of the rapidly expanding town of Bournemouth at the turn of the 20th century.  Wealthy landowners had settled originally on the East Cliff, then on the West Cliff, and later in Talbot Woods.  A lack of remaining land suitable for opulent dwellings, combined with the popularity of Bournemouth as the leading seaside resort during the late Victorian and Edwardian eras, meant that the privileged classes would need to build on the heathland that extended to the Bournemouth boundary.

As late as the 1970s, it was common for residents of Branksome Park and Canford Cliffs Village, to refer to themselves as living in Bournemouth.  Such residents included Tolkien, Mantovani, and Max Bygraves.  This dramatically fast expansion to the Town of Bournemouth, facilitated by the need for a main railway line from London to Bournemouth, gave rise to hundreds of working-class labourers and their families seeking work in the area, serving the wealthy landowners, working at the resort's newly built hotels, and on the railway. Housing was also required for these working-class families, and so Branksome, and Upper Parkstone quickly developed in the areas least likely to be seen by the wealthy. Until the late 1970s, the railway tracks beyond Bournemouth were not electrified.

Local facilities include a sports area with tennis courts and a bowling green. Branksome Park also has a small public library and is home to the All Saints Church constructed in 1877, and a school for disabled children which is located on the outskirts of the area.

There are many beautiful walks along many of the paths to the sea; called "Chines".  Some of these have now been built on such as Monkey Chine, but many are still used by walkers and cars such as Branksome and Alum Chine. The appellation "Chine" is peculiar to the Hampshire and Dorset coast, from Walkford to the Purbecks, and also to the Isle of Wight, and describes a deep wooded ravine, with, or without a stream or brook, leading to the sea.

Recent development
Branksome Park has seen much residential development in recent years. However, the styles of new buildings remain much less controversial than other places such as Sandbanks. However, the developer Eddie Mitchell (owner of Seven Developments), received planning permission and has recently finished construction of a controversial building development known as the 'Thunderbird' which is a  residential development. The building has also received many awards, making it one of the best-known residential buildings of Dorset. Because the style and architecture of existing housing stock is much older, new plans for developments must fit in with existing properties and styles. According to the rules on development in Branksome Park, one can only build more than one property on a plot that is 3/4 of an acre or larger. In 2006, two large Victorian houses were demolished to make way for a controversial new housing development with 20 three storey homes.

External links 

Branksome Park website.
Branksome Park in the dorset page.
Victory over the mobile phone masts- BBC news.

Areas of Poole
Bournemouth, Christchurch and Poole